Giuseppe De Capitani D'Arzago (15 February 1870, Milan – 17 November 1945) was an Italian Liberal Party politician. He was the 2nd mayor of Milan. He served in the Senate and Chamber of Deputies of the Kingdom of Italy. He was a recipient of the Order of Saints Maurice and Lazarus.

References

1870 births
1945 deaths
Italian nobility
Italian Liberal Party politicians
National Fascist Party politicians
Government ministers of Italy
Mussolini Cabinet
Deputies of Legislature XXIV of the Kingdom of Italy
Deputies of Legislature XXV of the Kingdom of Italy
Deputies of Legislature XXVI of the Kingdom of Italy
Deputies of Legislature XXVII of the Kingdom of Italy
Members of the Senate of the Kingdom of Italy
Mayors of Milan
Recipients of the Order of Saints Maurice and Lazarus